Deshamanya Kala Keerthi Dr.Premasiri Khemadasa (Sinhala: ආචාර්ය ප්‍රේමසිරි කේමදාස  ) (25 January 1937 – 24 October 2008) also known as "Khemadasa Master" was a Sri Lankan music composer. Exploring the various styles of music around the world Khemadasa endeavoured to develop a unique style of music. He combined Sinhala folk tunes, Hindustani music, Western music and many other streams of music in his compositions while adapting them to fit contemporary music.

Biography

Early life
Khemadasa grew up in Talpitiya, Wadduwa and attended St. John's College Panadura and then Sri Sumangala College Panadura. Born the thirteenth child into a poor rural family on the west coast of Sri Lanka, Khemadasa started with nothing. There was no musical heritage in his family. He was self-taught, learning how to play on cheap bamboo flutes when he was only 6 years old. In all his life, Khemadasa would never receive formal training in music. As a teenager, he became a gifted flautist.

Khemadasa was asked to come to the Radio Ceylon for an interview on the day he was scheduled to take his Senior School Certificate examination. He finished the examination much ahead of time and travelled to the audition. He passed the audition and became a member of Radio Ceylon.

His two daughters Anupa and Gayathri now moved into father's stream.

As a composer
Khemadasa's debut as a film composer came with Sirisena Wimalaweera's Roddie Kella. With his score for Bambaru Ewith he introduced a style of music unacquainted to Sri Lankan cinema. He then began collaborating with acclaimed director Lester James Peries handling the music for films like Golu Hadawatha and Nidhanaya. Critics praised his film scores and he was honorally dubbed "Khemadasa master." Khemadasa's signature in film music is moulded by the use of elements from Classical Western music and other sources to heighten the emotion suggested by the picture. Some of his compositions are influenced by Western composers of opera such as Giuseppe Verdi and Wolfgang Amadeus Mozart. 
 
Lately Premasiri Khemadasa has given his contribution to films such as Agnidahaya and very recently to Ammavarune, the last film by Lester James Peiris who has announced his retirement.

Other scores written by the master for films such as Hansawilak, Thunweniyamaya, Paradige, Yasa Isuru widened his acclaim in the field of cinema. He has also composed music for films produced outside Sri Lanka (Thousand Flowers).  
  
Dr. Khemadasa's contribution to teledramas also brought outstanding masterpieces to the public. His collaboration with director Jayantha Chandrasiri has turned out remarkable products whereas the themes he created for Chandrasiri's television series Dandubasnamanaya have shown unprecedented power of mesmerisation. A repertoire of scores written for teledramas including Chandrasiri's Weda hamine, Sathara denek senpathiyo, Akala sandhya, Dharmasena Pathiraja's Gangulen egodata, Ella langa walawwa, Pura sakmana and Bandula Vithanage's Asalwesiyo bestowed the public with unforgettable musical experiences.  Also, he has contributed to the teledrama Sadisi tharanaya by Devinda Koongahage, which is most probably his last contribution for a teledrama.
 
He also contributed to stage dramas such as Jayantha Chandrasiri's Mora, Ath, and Dharmasiri Bandaranayake's Makarakshaya & Dhawala bheeshana.

Furthermore, he has composed symphonies like Muhuda, Mage kale mavni and Sinhala Avurudda. His cantata named Pirinivan Mangalya, probably the only Buddhist cantata ever composed, was based on the death of the Lord Buddha and it was played at his funeral by the students of the Khemadasa Foundation.

The presence of operatic and harmonic vocals in his music is explained by his vast knowledge of opera and harmony. In his lifetime he made many experiments with techniques of singing and playing, which include the use of asymmetric patterns of beats, revolutionary harmonies and novel techniques of playing musical instruments such as the sitar.

Khemadasa is the only known Sri Lankan musician who practised and created opera. He has a large group of students many of whom were derived from rural milieus and trained for performing in his operas.  His famous operas include Manasawila, Doramandalawa and Sondura Varnadasi. Recently he created the opera, Agni (opera) about early civilisation. His operas, being written in Sinhalese, form what can be recognised as Sinhalese opera. Khemadasa and his pupils have conducted shows in several countries.
After a layoff following a kidney transplant he returned to the field of music, even in his 70s, trying to secure the future of Sri Lankan music. At the time of the maestro's demise on 24 October 2008, he was 71 years old.

Music director

Films
Nedayo (1976)

 Sobana Sitha (1964)
 Sanasuma Kothanada (1966)
 Manamalayo (1967)
 Rena Giraw (1967) 
 Golu Hadawatha (1968)
 Hanthane Kathawa (1969) 
 Ran Onchilla (1971) 
 Nidhanaya (1972)
 Duleeka (1974) 
 Desa Nisa (1975)
 Bambaru Avith (1978)
 Muwan Palassa 1 (1979)
 Hingana Kolla (1979) 
 Hansa Vilak (1980) 
 Janaka Saha Manju
 Yasa Isuru (1982) 
 Kaliyugaya (1983)
 Thunweni Yamaya (1983)
 Dadayama (1984) 
 Yuganthaya (1985)
 Avurududa (1986)
 Sandakada Pahana (1988)
 Kristhu Charithaya (1990)
 Gini Avi Saha Gini Keli (1998)
 Julietge Bhumikawa (1998)
 Agnidahaya (2002)
 Guerilla Marketing (2005)
 Sudu Kalu Saha Alu (2005)
 Maldeniye Simiyon
 Surabi dena
 Sirimadura
 Sonduru Dadabima (2003)
 Randiya Dahara (2004)
 Ammawarune (2006)
 Kanyavi (2009)

Tamil film
 Wasanthaththil Oru Wanawil

International films
 Melam Kottu Thali Kattu [Tamil - India]
 Thousand Flowers
 Music Garden

Stage Dramas
 Bari Sil
 Sithijaya
 Manasa Wila
 Doramadala
 Mora
 Ath
 Havila sara
 Diriya Mawa saha Age Daruwo

Operas 

Manasa Villa
Sonduru warnadasi
Agni (opera)

Teledramas
 Ella Laga Walawwa
 Golu Hadawatha 
 Weda Hamine
 Dandubasnamanaya
 Durganthaya
 Rajana
 Akalasandya
 Bogala Soundiris
 Diya Bubula
 Idorayaka Mal pipila
 Uthamavi
Kelimadala
Sathara Denek Sempathiyo

Awards

See also
Agni Opera

Further reading
 මාස්ටර් සංගීත යුග යාත්‍රිකයා
 අඩසියවසක කේමදාස නම් ඔහු – සිරිල් බී. පෙරේරා (1987)
 කේමදාස න්‍යාය භාවිතය සහ අරගලය – ලූශන් බුලත්සිංහල (2000)
 සංගීතයේ හෙට දවස කේමදාස – උපුල් ගුරුගේ (2001)

References

External links
Premasiri Khemadasa Agni Opera

A man on fire
Comprehensive biography of Khemadasa 
The immortal note that captures the heart beat of the nation 
Sondura Warnadaasi – an Opera by Khemadasa
Listen to compositions by Dr. Khemadasa at Sinhala Jukebox
Reminiscence of his real-life sonata
Sonic canvas of Premasiri Khemadasa
Premasiri Khemadasa in Sinhala
ප්‍රේමසිරි කේමදාසයන්ගේ නිර්මාණ  අපයෝජකයන්ට වැඩ වරදියි
මට තාත්තා වගේ වෙන්න බැහැ - ගයත්‍රි කේමදාස
කේමදාස කියන්නේ සංගීත පැක්ටරියක් නෙවෙයි

Sinhalese musicians
1937 births
2008 deaths
Sri Lankan composers
Alumni of Sri Sumangala College, Panadura
Alumni of St. John's College, Panadura
Sinhalese singers
20th-century Sri Lankan male singers
Deshamanya
Kala Keerthi
People from Panadura